Ninein is a protein that in humans is encoded by the NIN gene. Ninein, together with its paralog Ninein-like protein is one of the proteins important for centrosomal function. This protein is important for positioning and anchoring the microtubules minus-ends in epithelial cells. Localization of this protein to the centrosome requires three leucine zippers in the central coiled-coil domain. Multiple alternatively spliced transcript variants that encode different isoforms have been reported.

References

Further reading

EF-hand-containing proteins